"Do That to Me One More Time" is a song performed by the American pop duo Captain & Tennille. It was their 13th charting hit in the United States, and their second number-one hit on the Billboard Hot 100 chart. The song was included on the duo's 1979 studio album, Make Your Move, and was written by Toni Tennille. It features a Lyricon solo by saxophonist Tom Scott.

History
After a decline in popularity from the height of their success in the mid-1970s, the Captain and Tennille signed with Casablanca Records under the guidance of Neil Bogart. "Do That to Me One More Time" was a comeback for the duo, but they failed to achieve further success on Casablanca and their contract was not renewed. Vocalist and songwriter Toni Tennille played the song for Bogart at her house with husband Daryl Dragon in Pacific Palisades, California on an electric piano. Bogart reacted enthusiastically, saying: "That's a smash! There's no doubt in my mind that's going to be your first single." According to Billboard, the song is about sex, specifically "male virility."

Composition and legacy 
The song is performed in the key of C major.  The key changes to D major for the final chorus and ending.  It moves at a tempo of 90 beats per minute in common time.  The vocals span from E4 to B5.

Reception
"Do That to Me One More Time" became Captain & Tennille's second and final number-one hit (also their final Top 40 song in the U.S.) when it reached the pinnacle of the Billboard Hot 100 chart the week ending February 16, 1980. The song had logged four consecutive weeks in the runner-up position on this chart behind Michael Jackson's hit "Rock with You" before ascending to the top of the chart. The song spent a single week in the pole position before being succeeded on February 23 by Queen's "Crazy Little Thing Called Love". Overall, "Do That to Me One More Time" spent 27 weeks on the Hot 100. The song also achieved some crossover success on the Billboard adult contemporary and R&B charts. It was their highest-charting hit on the UK Singles Chart, where it reached number seven in March 1980. It also peaked at number three in Australia and was number one in the Netherlands.  Record World called it a "warm & tender pop-a/c gem." 

The duo also recorded a version of the song in Spanish translated as Amame Una Vez Mas.

Charts

Weekly charts

Year-end charts

All-time charts

Certifications

See also
List of Billboard Hot 100 number-one singles of 1980

References

External links
UK 7" release info Discogs

1980 singles
Captain & Tennille songs
Swoop (Australian band) songs
Billboard Hot 100 number-one singles
Cashbox number-one singles
Number-one singles in South Africa
Ultratop 50 Singles (Flanders) number-one singles
1979 songs
Songs written by Toni Tennille
Casablanca Records singles
1970s ballads